The , also referred to as One Osaka, is a regional political party in Osaka Prefecture, Japan. Founded in 2010 by then-Governor Tōru Hashimoto, its main platform is pursuing the Osaka Metropolis plan of merging the prefecture and some of its cities into "One Osaka", reducing overlapping bureaucratic organizations of the prefecture and the city of Osaka, towards Dōshūsei.

The party is a major force in the politics within Osaka Prefecture, with the party holding the most seats in the Osaka Prefectural Assembly, Osaka City Assembly and Sakai City Assembly, as well as the positions of Governor of Osaka and mayor of three cities within the prefecture (Osaka, Moriguchi and Hirakata).

History 
Hashimoto, a lawyer and popular TV personality, was elected Governor of Osaka in January 2008 with the support of the local branches of the Liberal Democratic Party and New Komeito. However, his support for the Osaka Metropolis plan and the restructuring of Japan's 47 prefectures into a few number of geographically large regions saw him face opposition from the mayors of Osaka and Sakai cities. In face of this opposition and frustrated with the lack of attention given to the issues by the major parties at the national level, Hashimoto announced his intention to form a regional party that would focus on the betterment of Osaka.

In February 2009, Hashimoto's plan for the prefecture to purchase the Osaka World Trade Center Building from the city and relocate the prefectural government offices into the building was defeated in the prefectural assembly. By April 2010 the group had broken away from the Liberal Democratic Party and expanded to 22 members. On 19 April 2010 it was officially registered as the Osaka Restoration Association with 30 members.

In the unified local elections in April 2011, the Osaka Restoration Association won an outright majority in the prefectural assembly and became strongest party in the assemblies of both Osaka City and Sakai City. On November 27, 2011, in an unprecedented double election, Hashimoto and Secretary-General Ichirō Matsui were elected as Mayor of Osaka City and Governor of Osaka Prefecture respectively.

When the Japan Restoration Association, also headed by Hashimoto and Matsui, was founded in 2012 it was announced that the Osaka organization would come under the umbrella of the national party.

In the Sakai city mayoral election held in September 2013, incumbent Osami Takeyama ran as an independent (with the support of the Liberal Democratic Party and an endorsement from the Komeito party) and defeated the Osaka Restoration Association candidate Katsutoshi Nishibayashi. Takeyama first won office in 2009 with the backing of Hashimoto (prior to the party being formed), but lost the support of the party when he changed his position regarding the Metropolis merger plan. This was the first time in the party's history that a candidate had lost a mayoral election. Takeyama received 50.69% of the vote, almost 7% more than in 2009.

In 2015, with Hashimoto as Mayor of Osaka city and Matsui as Governor of Osaka Prefecture, the party promoted a merger plan that, if successful, would see the relationship between the 24 municipalities of Osaka and the prefecture be changed to resemble that of the Tokyo metropolis and create four new semi-autonomous districts. The plan was defeated in a referendum in May 2015 by a margin of less than 1%. Following the result, Hashimoto announced he would not contest the mayoral election at the end of 2015.

The party successfully contested the "double election" of the Osaka city mayoral election and prefecture gubernatorial election held on 22 November 2015. In the mayoral election, Hirofumi Yoshimura, a former member of the national House of Representatives, was selected as the party's candidate to replace Hashimoto. Yoshimura ran on a platform of reinstating the metropolis merger plan and received 56.4% of the 1.05 million votes cast. In the gubernatorial election, Matsui also campaigned in favour of the merger and was re-elected with 64% of the 3.14 million votes cast. The double victory has been considered a boost to the party's main policy of resurrecting the metropolis merger plan.

Presidents

References

External links 

Osaka Restoration Association 

Political parties established in 2010
Libertarian parties in Japan
Regional parties in Japan
2010 establishments in Japan
Politics of Osaka Prefecture
Organizations based in Osaka Prefecture